Miðfjörður is a small fjord as well as a conjoined valley in the northwest of Iceland.

The fjord has a length of 14 km and a width of up to 3,5 km. The valley is about 20 km long.

Miðfjörður is fed by the river Miðfjarðará  and empties onto Húnaflói bay. The town of Hvammstangi is located at the eastern side of the fjord.

The main highway through rural Iceland, Route 1, passes by the southern tip of Miðfjörður.

See also
 Fjords of Iceland

References

Fjords of Iceland
North Iceland